"Watching the Wildlife" is the seventh and last single by British pop band Frankie Goes to Hollywood. Released on 23 February 1987, it is taken from the album Liverpool.

Of the three singles culled from Liverpool, "Watching the Wildlife" is the most radio-friendly, lacking the rocky sound of "Rage Hard" and "Warriors of the Wasteland". However, the single only reached number 28 on the UK Singles Chart and #23 in Germany. It is also the only one of the three Liverpool singles not to have a CD single release at that time and the mix used on the 7" vinyl single has never appeared on a UK issued compact disc, but a German 4-track single was bundled with the Bang!/Hard On CD/DVD set and apparently contains the mix in question, said mix also features on Frankie Said, Salvo's "best of" offering from 2012. The 1988 Record Collector magazine discography of the band contains a listing for a UK CD single, complete with catalogue number, but this was an error based on assumption. To date, no original 1987 copy has come to light, not even in a promotional form, and can be safely disregarded as fiction.

The 7" packaging made reference to animals, with a panda and dolphin on the sleeve. The cassette single made more references to sexual intercourse. To wit, the instrumental mix was dubbed "The Condom Mix" on the cassette single. The promotional condom that was to be distributed with each single would have stopped the single sales counting towards the UK charts as the official chart provider had introduced new rules to this effect, so the idea was abandoned. Promotional copies complete with the condom do exist, however.

The single also features a track, "The Waves" on the B-side.

Track listing
(All discographical information pertains to UK releases only)

7" ZTT / ZTAS 26
"animal fur/animal smell"

 "Watching the Wildlife"  – 3:50
 "The Waves"  – 3:02

12" ZTT / 12 ZTAS 26
 "Watching the Wildlife" (hotter) [on the label named as: "animal fur"]  – 9:02
 "Wildlife Bit 1" [unlisted] - :38
 "Wildlife Bit 2" [unlisted] - :37
 "Watching the Wildlife" (voiceless)  – 3:49
 "The Waves"  – 3:02

"Watching the Wildlife" (voiceless) was rereleased in 2012 on CD Sexmix Disk 2, Track 13. 

12" ZTT / 12 ZTAX 26
 "Watching the Wildlife" (movement 2) – 7:12
 "Wildlife Bit 3" – 6:24
 "Wildlife Bit 4" – 4:20
 "The Waves" – 3:02

"Movement 2" is a mainly instrumental mix, featuring a unique orchestration of the song by arranger David Bedford, and until recently was one of the rarest tracks by Frankie, being only available on this 12" record which itself was a low selling item. The Movement 2 mix finally made it onto compact disc as part of ZTTs Element series reissues. 
"Wildlife Bit 3" is an extended mix by engineer Robert Kraushaar.
"Wildlife Bit 4" is an instrumental mix without drums, guitar or bass, showcasing the orchestral arrangement.

12" ZTT / 12 ZTE 26
"Beobachtungen im Wilden Leben" (roughly translated as "Observations in the wild life")

 "Beobachtungen im Wilden Leben"  (Die Letzten Tage der Menschheit Mix) (use a condom) – 10:16
 "Wildlife Bit 1" [unlisted] - :38
 "Wildlife Bit 2" [unlisted] - :37
 "Watching the Wildlife" (voiceless) – 3:49
 "The Waves" – 3:02

 "Die letzten tage der menschheit mix" ('The last days of mankind mix') was deceptively listed as mixed by Klaus Schulze, which got ZTT into trouble with Schulze. It was actually mixed by Paul Morley, and features samples from an AIDS phoneline. This release was deliberately packaged to look like a German import, complete with German titles, an Island Records catalogue number (in addition to its correct UK ZTT one) and even an Island Records label design. It is the only UK issue not to have a normal ZTT label.

MC ZTT / CTIS 26
 "Watching the Wildlife" (Bit 4) [aka "Orchestral Wildlife"]  – 4:26
 "Watching the Wildlife" (Hotter) ["Hotter Wildlife"]  – 9:09
 "The Waves" – 3:02
 "Wildlife Bit 1" ["One Bit"] - :38
 "Wildlife Bit 2" ["Two Bit"] - :37
 "Watching the Wildlife" (Bit 3) [aka "The Condom Mix"]  – 6:26

Although the tracks were listed on the sleeve with unique titles ("Orchestral Wildlife", "The Condom Mix" etc.), they are in fact the same tracks that appeared on the first two 12" singles.
This cassette single was included on the 2011 deluxe reissue of the album Liverpool, with a reordered track listing (being Bit 3, Bit 4, The Waves, Hotter, Bit 1, Bit 2).

Digital download ZTT
 "Watching The Wildlife" (7" Mix) - 3:52
 "Watching The Wildlife" (Hotter) - 9:08
 "Watching The Wildlife" (Movement 2) - 7:13
 "Watching The Wildlife" (Die Letzten Tage Der Menscheit) - 10:14
 "Watching The Wildlife" (Bit 1) - :38
 "Watching The Wildlife" (Bit 2) - :37
 "Watching The Wildlife" (Bit 3) - 6:25
 "Watching The Wildlife" (Bit 4) - 4:24
 "Watching The Wildlife" (Voiceless) - 3:50
 "The Waves" - 3:02
 The version of the "7" Mix" included here is the version from "Frankie Said", which is not the exact same mix.

Chart performance

References

External links
 ZTT Records

1987 singles
Frankie Goes to Hollywood songs
Song recordings produced by Stephen Lipson
1987 songs
ZTT Records singles